Tano may refer to the following people
Given name
 "Don Tano", the Sicilian capomafia Gaetano Badalamenti
Tano Cimarosa (1922–2008), Italian actor

Surname
, Japanese voice actress
Barbro Tano (born 1939), Swedish cross-country skier
Eugenio Tano (1840–1914), Italian painter
Kevin Tano (born 1993), Dutch association football player 
Kosei Tano (1914–?), Japanese Olympic water polo player
 Rocco Tano also known as Rocco Siffredi, an Italian pornography actor